A global city (also known as a power city, world city, alpha city, or world center) is a city that serves as a primary node in the global economic network. The concept originates from geography and urban studies, based on the thesis that globalization has created a hierarchy of strategic geographic locations with varying degrees of influence over finance, trade, and culture worldwide. The global city represents the most complex and significant hub within the international system, characterized by links binding it to other cities that have direct, tangible effects on global socioeconomic affairs.

The criteria of a global city have varied over time and depending on the source; common features include a high degree of urban development, a large population, the presence of major multinational companies, a significant and globalized financial sector, well developed and internationally linked transportation infrastructure, local or national economic dominance, high quality educational and research institutions, and a globally influential output of ideas, innovations, or cultural products. Quintessential examples, based on most indices and research, include New York City, London, Paris, and Tokyo.

Origin and terminology 
The term global city was popularized by sociologist Saskia Sassen in her 1991 book, The Global City: New York, London, Tokyo. Prior to that, various other terms were used to describe urban centers with approximate features. The term world city, meaning a city heavily involved in global trade, appeared in a May 1886 description of Liverpool, by The Illustrated London News; British sociologist and geographer Patrick Geddes likewise used the term in 1915. The term megacity entered common use in the late 19th or early 20th century, with the earliest documented example being a publication by the University of Texas in 1904. In the 21st century, the various terms are usually focused on a city's financial power and high technology infrastructure, with other factors becoming less relevant.

Criteria

Competing groups have developed multiple alternative methods to classify and rank world cities and to distinguish them from non-world cities. Although there is a consensus on the leading world cities, the chosen criteria affect which other cities are included. Selection criteria may be based on a yardstick value (e.g., if the producer-service sector is the largest sector then city  is a world city) or on an imminent determination (if the producer-service sector of city  is greater than the combined producer-service sectors of  other cities then city  is a world city.) Cities can fall from their respective rankings, as in the case of cities that have become less cosmopolitan and less internationally renowned in the current era.

Characteristics
Although criteria are variable and fluid, typical characteristics of world cities include:
 The most prominent criterion has been providing a variety of international financial services, notably in finance, insurance, real estate, banking, accountancy, and marketing; and their amalgamation of financial headquarters, a stock exchange, and other major financial institutions.
 Headquarters of numerous multinational corporations.
 Domination of the trade and economy of a large surrounding area
 Major manufacturing centres with port and container facilities
 Considerable decision-making power on a daily basis and at a global level
 Centres of new ideas and innovation in business, economics, and culture.
 Centres of digital and other media and communications for global networks
 Dominance of the national region with great international significance
 High percentage of residents employed in the services sector and information sector
 High-quality educational institutions, including renowned universities and research facilities; and attracting international student attendance
 Multi-functional infrastructure offering some of the best legal, medical, and entertainment facilities in the country
 High diversity in language, culture, religion, and ideologies

Rankings
Global city rankings are numerous, with one study suggesting as many as 300. New York City, London, Tokyo, and Paris, are notably the most prominent metropolises mentioned in this respect. They have been ranked in the top four positions in the Global Cities Index and Global Power City Index since both indices' inception in 2008, with New York and London rotating for first position over the last ten years exclusively in the top two spots.

GaWC study

Jon Beaverstock, Richard G. Smith, and Peter J. Taylor established the Globalization and World Cities Research Network (GaWC). A list of world cities in the GaWC Research Bulletin 5 is ranked by their connectivity through four "advanced producer services": accountancy, advertising, banking/finance, and law. The GaWC inventory identifies three levels of global cities and several sub-ranks, although the authors caution that "concern for city rankings operates against the spirit of the GaWC project" .

The 2004 rankings added several new indicators while continuing to rank city-economics more heavily than political and cultural factors. The 2008 version of the list, similar to the 1998 version, is sorted into categories of Alpha world cities (with four sub-categories), Beta world cities (three sub-categories), Gamma world cities (three sub-categories), and cities with High sufficiency and Sufficiency presence. The cities in the top three classifications in the 2020 edition are as follows:

Alpha ++ 

  London
  New York City

Alpha + 

  Beijing
  Dubai
  Hong Kong
  Paris
  Shanghai
  Singapore
  Tokyo

Alpha 

  Amsterdam
  Brussels
  Chicago
  Frankfurt
  Jakarta
  Kuala Lumpur
  Los Angeles
  Madrid
  Mexico City
  Milan
  Moscow
  Mumbai
  São Paulo
  Sydney
  Toronto

Global Cities Index
In 2008, the American journal Foreign Policy, working with the consulting firm A.T. Kearney and the Chicago Council on Global Affairs, published a ranking of global cities based on consultation with Saskia Sassen, Witold Rybczynski, and others. Foreign Policy noted that "the world's biggest, most interconnected cities help set global agendas, weather transnational dangers, and serve as the hubs of global integration. They are the engines of growth for their countries and the gateways to the resources of their regions." The ranking is based on 27 metrics across five dimensions: business activity, human capital, information exchange, cultural experience, and political engagement. Since 2015, it has been published with a separate index, the Global Cities Outlook, which is a projection of a city's potential based on rate of change in 13 indicators across four dimensions: personal well-being, economics, innovation, and governance. The top ranked cities in 2021 are listed below:

  New York City
  London
  Paris
  Tokyo
  Los Angeles
  Beijing
  Hong Kong
  Chicago
  Singapore
  Shanghai

Global City Competitiveness Index
In 2012, the Economist Intelligence Unit (The Economist Group) ranked the competitiveness of global cities according to their demonstrated ability to attract capital, businesses, talent, and visitors.

Global Cities Initiative 
A study by Brookings Institution conducted in 2016 introduced its own typology, sorting global cities into seven categories: Global Giants, Asian Anchors, Emerging Gateways, Factory China, Knowledge Capitals, American Middleweights, and International Middleweights.

The Global Giants classification includes wealthy, extremely large metropolitan areas that are the largest cities in developed nations. They are hubs for financial markets and major corporations, and serve as key nodes in global flows of capital and of talent.

  London
  Los Angeles
  New York City
  Osaka–Kobe
  Paris
  Tokyo

Global City Lab
An analysis report compiled by the Global City Lab of the Global Top 500 Cities was released in New York on 30 December 2021.

The top 10 of the "2020 Global Top 500 Cities" by brand value were as follows:
  New York City
  London
  Tokyo
  Paris
  Sydney
  Singapore
  Los Angeles
  Toronto
  Berlin
  Hong Kong

Global Economic Power Index
The Global Economic Power Index reflecting three dimensions of economic power, was introduced in 2012. In 2015, the second Global Economic Power Index, a meta list compiled by Richard Florida, was published by The Atlantic (distinct from a namesake list published by the Martin Prosperity Institute), with city composite rank based on five other lists.

The top 10 global cities in 2015 were as follows:
  New York City
  London
  Tokyo
  Hong Kong
  Paris
  Singapore
  Los Angeles
  Seoul
  Vienna
  Stockholm &  Toronto

Global Financial Centres Index

Strength as a financial center has become one of the pre-eminent indicators of a global city's ranking. As of March 2022, the cities representing the top ten financial centers according to the Global Financial Centres Index by analytics firm Z/Yen were:

  New York City
  London
  Hong Kong
  Shanghai
  Los Angeles
  Singapore
  San Francisco
  Beijing
  Tokyo
  Shenzhen

Global Power City Index
The Tokyo-based Institute for Urban Strategies at The Mori Memorial Foundation, issued a comprehensive study of global cities in 2008. They are ranked in six categories: economy, research and development, cultural interaction, livability, environment, and accessibility, with 70 individual indicators among them. The top ten world cities are also ranked by subjective categories, including manager, researcher, artist, visitor and resident.

The top 10 cities in the 2021 Global Power City Index were:
  London
  New York City
  Tokyo
  Paris
  Singapore
  Amsterdam
  Berlin
  Seoul
  Madrid
  Shanghai

The Wealth Report
"The Wealth Report" (a global perspective on prime property and wealth) is made by the London-based estate agent Knight Frank LLP and the Citi Private Bank. The report includes a "Global Cities Survey", evaluating which cities are considered the most important to the world's HNWIs (high-net-worth individuals, having over $25 million of investable assets each). For the Global Cities Survey, Citi Private Bank's wealth advisors, and Knight Frank's luxury property specialists were asked to name the cities that they considered the most important to HNWIs, in regard to "economic activity", "political power", "knowledge and influence", and "quality of life".

Most important cities to UHNWIs in 2020:

 London &  New York City
 Paris
 Tokyo
 Hong Kong
 Chicago &  Los Angeles
 Singapore
 Munich
 Amsterdam

The World's Most Talked About Cities 
A study by ING Media, a London-based built environment communications firm, has ranked 250 global cities by total online mentions across social media and online news for 2019. It found that a fifth of digital mentions were for Tokyo, New York City, London, and Paris, identifying these as the world's super brands. The Top 10 in the 2019 edition were:

  Tokyo
  New York City
  London
  Paris
  Madrid
  Dubai
  Rome
  Barcelona
  Seoul
  Osaka

Summary of rankings
The A.T. Kearney ranking most closely resembled the composite summary of rankings. Note that the Global Financial Centres Index rankings were not included in this summary of other rankings.

See also

 Caput Mundi
 Ecumenopolis
 Financial centre
 Globalization
 List of cities by GDP
 Megalopolis (city type)
 Metropolis
 Primate city
 Ranally city rating system

References

External links

 Repository of Links Relating to Urban Places
 The World-System's City System: A Research Agenda  by Jeffrey Kentor and Michael Timberlake of the University of Utah and David Smith of University of California, Irvine
 UN-HABITAT.:. The State of the World's Cities

Types of cities
Economic geography
Metropolitan areas
Urban areas
Lists of cities
Economic globalization
Loughborough University
Cultural geography
Index numbers